Munn v. Illinois, 94 U.S. 113 (1876), was a United States Supreme Court case in which the Court upheld the power of state governments to regulate private industries that affect "the common good."

Facts
The case was developed because in 1871, the legislature of Illinois responded to pressure from the National Grange, an association of farmers, by setting maximum rates that private companies could charge for the storage and transport of agricultural products. The Chicago grain warehouse firm of Munn and Scott was found guilty of violating the law but appealed the conviction on the grounds that the law was an unconstitutional deprivation of property without due process of law that violated the Fourteenth Amendment. A state trial court and the Illinois State Supreme Court both ruled in favor of the State.

Judgment 
The Supreme Court decided the appeal in 1877. Chief Justice Morrison Waite spoke for the majority, which affirmed the constitutionality of state regulation extending to private industries that affect public interests. Because grain storage facilities were devoted to public use, their rates were subject to public regulation. He specified that any such regulation by the state government would not be in violation of the due process clause of the Fourteenth Amendment. Chief Justice Waite declared that even if Congress alone is granted control over interstate commerce, a state could take action in the public interest without impairing that federal control.

Justice Field and Justice Strong dissented.

See also
United States constitutional law
Granger Laws

Notes

References

External links

Grain industry of the United States
Legal history of Illinois
Price controls
United States substantive due process case law
United States Supreme Court cases of the Waite Court
1876 in United States case law
Regulation in the United States
United States Supreme Court cases